Meaden is the surname of:

 Deborah Meaden (born 1959), English businesswoman 
 Henry Meaden (1862–?), English cricketer
 John Meaden, Bishop of Newfoundland 1956–1965
 Levi Meaden (born c.1987), Canadian actor
 Peter Meaden (1941–1978), music publicist, managed the Who
 Terence Meaden (born 1935), British archaeologist